SuperCam is a suite of remote-sensing instruments for the Mars 2020 Perseverance rover mission that performs remote analyses of rocks and soils with a camera, two lasers and four spectrometers to seek organic compounds that could hold biosignatures of past microbial life on Mars, if it ever existed there.

SuperCam was developed in collaboration between the Research Institute in Astrophysics and Planetology of the University of Toulouse in France, the French Space Agency (CNES), Los Alamos National Laboratory, the University of Hawaii and the University of Malaga in Spain. The Principal Investigator is Roger Wiens from Los Alamos National Laboratory. SuperCam is an improved version of the successful ChemCam instruments of the Curiosity rover that have been upgraded with two different lasers and detectors. SuperCam is used in conjunction with the AEGIS (Autonomous Exploration for Gathering Increased Science) targeting system, a program in which Vandi Verma, NASA roboticist and engineer, helped develop.

In April 2018, SuperCam entered the final stages of assembly and testing. The flight model was installed to the rover in June 2019. The rover mission was launched on 30 July 2020.

Instruments

For measurements of chemical composition, the instrument suite uses a version of the successful ChemCam instruments of the Curiosity rover that have been upgraded with two different lasers and detectors. SuperCam's instruments are able to identify the kinds of chemicals that could be evidence of past life on Mars. SuperCam is a suite of various instruments, and the collection of correlated measurements on a target can be used to determine directly the geochemistry and mineralogy of samples.

The suite has several integrated instruments: Raman spectroscopy, time-resolved fluorescence (TRF) spectroscopy, and Visible and InfraRed (VISIR) reflectance spectroscopy to provide preliminary information about the mineralogy and molecular structure of samples under consideration, as well as being able to directly measure organic compounds. The total is four complementary spectrometers, making the suite sensitive enough to measure trace amounts of chemicals.

LIBS

The remote laser-induced breakdown spectroscopy (LIBS) system emits a 1064-nm laser beam to investigate targets as small as a grain of rice from a distance of more than 7 meters, allowing the rover to study targets beyond the reach of its arm. The beam vaporizes a tiny amount of rock, creating a hot plasma. SuperCam then measures the colors of light in the plasma, which provide clues to the target's elemental composition. Its laser is also capable of remotely clearing away surface dust, giving all of its instruments a clear view of the targets. LIBS unit contains three spectrometers. Two of these handle the visible and violet portion of the VISIR spectra, while the IR portion is recorded in the mast.

Raman spectroscopy
SuperCam's Raman spectrometer (at 532 nm) investigates targets up to 12 m from the rover. In the Raman spectroscopy technique, most of the green laser light reflects back at the same wavelength that was sent, but a small fraction of the light interacts with the target molecules, changing the wavelength in proportion to the vibrational energy of the molecular bonds. By spectrally observing the returned Raman light, the identity of the minerals can be determined.

IR spectrometer
The infrared spectrometer, provided by France, operates in the near-infrared (1.3 to 2.6 micrometers) wavelengths and its photodiodes, or detectors, are cooled by small thermoelectric coolers to ensure that they operate between −100 °C and −50 °C at all times. This instrument will analyze many of the clay minerals and help unravel the history of liquid water on Mars. The types of clay minerals and their abundances give clues about the nature of the water that was present, whether fresh or salty, acidic or neutral pH, whether it might have been icy or warm, and whether the water was present for a long period of time. These are key questions to understand how habitable the surface environment was in the distant past.

Camera/telescope
SuperCam's optical camera acquires high-resolution color images of samples under study, which also help determine the surface geology. This camera can also study how atmospheric water and dust absorb or reflect solar radiation, which may help to develop weather forecasts. SuperCam is also equipped with a microphone to capture the first audio recordings from the surface of Mars. The microphone is the same model (Knowles Corp EK) as the ones that flew to Mars on the 1998 Mars Polar Lander and the 2007 Phoenix lander. However, neither mission was able to record sounds.

Spectrometers – Table 
The detectors of all four spectrometers are cooled to just below 0 °C by thermoelectric coolers. The photodiodes for the infrared (IR) spectrometer are further cooled to between −100 °C and −50 °C at all times.

References

External links 

 Mars 2020 Home site

Mars 2020 instruments
Mars imagers
Astrobiology